Aviere has been borne by at least three ships of the Italian Navy and may refer to:

 , a  launched in 1937 and sunk in 1942.
 , a  launched in 1942 as USS Nicholson and transferred to Italy in 1951. She was sunk as a target in 1975.
 , a  launched in 1984 as Thi Quar for Iraq. Seized by Italy in 1993 and renamed Aviere.

Italian Navy ship names